Shane Lewis may refer to:

Shane Lewis (swimmer) (1973–2021), Australian swimmer
Shane Lewis (racing driver) (born 1967), American racing driver
Shayne Lewis, fictional character